AeroJet is an airline based in Angola. It was established in 2002 and operates Embraer ERJ-140 aircraft.

Since 2018, the airline also performs flying services for virtual airline Fly Angola, flying one EMB-145 for that company.

Fleet
The AeroJet fleet consists of the following aircraft (at November 2021):

See also
 List of airlines of Angola

References

Airlines of Angola
Airlines established in 2002
Angolan brands